Orcenais is a commune in the Cher department in the Centre-Val de Loire region of France.

Geography
The small river Vilaine forms most of the commune’s eastern border.

Population

Sights
 The church of St. Martin, dating from the twelfth century.
 A sixteenth-century manorhouse.
 A fifteenth-century chapel.
 The cemetery cross, bearing the date of 1488.

See also
Communes of the Cher department

References

External links

Annuaire Mairie website 

Communes of Cher (department)